Bryan Schouten (born 10 September 1994) is a Dutch former motorcycle racer who retired at the end of the 2017 season. Schouten is a former winner of the Dutch ONK 125GP Championship and the Dutch ONK Moto3 Championship, and has also competed in the German IDM 125GP Championship, the German IDM Moto3 Championship, the Spanish CEV Moto3 series and the European Superstock 600 Championship. He won the IDM Superstock 600 Championship in 2016, but even as a champion he could not find the resources to start in 2017. He decided to stop his career , however, less than a week later, Schouten returned to his decision when Ten Kate Racing Products approached him for testing the new Honda CBR-1000RR SP2 and started in the (Dutch) NK SuperCup 1000. After one season, Schouten has decided to start his social career at the age of 23 years. But his dreams are that there will be time and opportunities to help young riders in the future - maybe even on a part-time schedule.

Career statistics

Grand Prix motorcycle racing

By season

Races by year

Supersport World Championship

Races by year
(key) (Races in bold indicate pole position; races in italics indicate fastest lap)

References

External links
 
 Profile on MotoGP.com
 Profile on WorldSBK.com

Dutch motorcycle racers
Living people
125cc World Championship riders
Moto3 World Championship riders
1994 births
Supersport World Championship riders
21st-century Dutch people